Verdicenan Kadın ("Heart's decision" or "Heart's jury";  18259 December 1889) was a consort of Sultan Abdulmejid I of the Ottoman Empire.

Early life
Verdicenan Kadın was born in 1825 in Sukhum. Her original name was Saliha Achba. She was a member of the Abkhazian princely family, Achba. Her father was Prince Kaytuk Giorgi Bey Achba (1793–1848), and her mother was Princess Yelizaveta Hanım (1795–1843). She had four elder siblings, two brothers, Prince Ahmet Bey, and Prince Islam Musa Bey, and two sisters, Princess Peremrüz Hanım and Princess Embruvaz Hanım, and a younger brother, Prince Mehmed Bey. 

Kadın was brought to Istanbul as a young child, where her father entrusted her and her sisters to the care of Bezmiâlem Sultan, the mother of Sultan Abdulmejid I. Here her name was changed to Verdicenan in accordance with the custom of the Ottoman court.

Marriage
Verdicenan married Abdulmejid in 1844. She was given the title of "Sixth Kadın". On 9 December 1844, she gave birth to her first child, a daughter, Münire Sultan in the Topkapı Palace. In 1845, she was elevated to "Fifth Kadın". On 16 July 1848, she gave birth to Şehzade Ahmed Kemaleddin, in the Old Çırağan Palace. In 1851, she was elevated to "Fourth Kadın", and in 1852, to "Third Kadın". Verdicenan was known for her luxurious lifestyle and sense of style. She wore only clothes imported from Europe and luxurious jewelry; she never went out unless she was accompanied by at least ten ladies-in-waiting. Among these, there was her niece Leyla Achba, also known as Gülefşan Hanim, who became a well-known poet and writer, and Ayşe Zatimelek Hanım, who would become the fifth consort of one of Abdülmecid I's sons, Şehzade Selim Süleyman.

Widowhood
After Abdulmejid's death in 1861, she moved to Feriye Palace. Having lost her only daughter, Münire Sultan, in 1862, she was entrusted with Mediha Sultan, after her own mother Gülistü Kadın died in 1861. The relationship between the two of them was like mother and daughter. She kept Mediha under close surveillance, and always helped her whenever she had problems. In 1879, she played a major role in Mediha's marriage to Samipashazade Necip Bey, interceding with the sultan to allow Mediha to marry the man she loved rather than one chosen for her.

Death
Verdicenan Kadın died on 9 December 1889 in the Feriye Palace at the age of sixty-four, and was buried in the mausoleum of the imperial ladies at the Yeni Mosque, Istanbul.

Issue

In literature
Verdicenan is a character in Hıfzı Topuz's historical novel Abdülmecit: İmparatorluk Çökerken Sarayda 22 Yıl: Roman (2009).

See also
Kadın (title)
Ottoman Imperial Harem
List of consorts of the Ottoman sultans

References

Sources

1825 births
1889 deaths
People from the Ottoman Empire of Abkhazian descent
People from Sukhumi
19th-century people from the Ottoman Empire
Consorts of Abdulmejid I